Alister William Jack  (born 7 July 1963) is a Scottish politician serving as Secretary of State for Scotland since 2019. A member of the Scottish Conservatives, he has been the Member of Parliament (MP) for Dumfries and Galloway since 2017.

Early life
Jack was born on 7 July 1963 in Dumfries, Dumfriesshire, in Scotland to David and Jean Jack (who was Lord Lieutenant of Dumfries between 2006 and 2016). He was raised in Dalbeattie and Kippford. He was educated at Dalbeattie Primary School, at Crawfordton House – a private prep school near Moniaive, Dumfriesshire – and then at Glenalmond College, at that time an all-boys private boarding school. He later attended Heriot-Watt University.

Business career
Alister Jack is a businessman, having founded tent-hire and self-storage companies, the latter building his fortune of £20 million. He currently owns a farm of 1,200 acres in Courance, near Lockerbie. He formerly chaired the River Annan Fishery Board and Trust, Fisheries Management Scotland and Galloway Woodlands.

Political career

House of Commons
In the 1997 general election, Jack stood in Tweeddale, Ettrick and Lauderdale, but came third, being defeated by the Liberal Democrat future Secretary of State for Scotland Michael Moore.

Jack was elected to the House of Commons of the United Kingdom in the 2017 general election. He stood in the rural Scottish constituency of Dumfries and Galloway and defeated incumbent Scottish National Party MP Richard Arkless. Jack was one of the 13 Scottish Conservative MPs elected to the UK Parliament being the highest number since the 1983 general election.

He was a member of the Treasury Select Committee in the 57th Parliament. He signed a letter to the prime minister, Theresa May, on 16 February 2018, making suggestions about the way the United Kingdom should leave the European Union.

Jack was appointed Parliamentary Private Secretary (PPS) to the Leader of the House of Lords on 31 August 2018, a position he held until he was appointed an Assistant Government Whip on 20 February 2019. On 23 April 2019 he was appointed Lord Commissioner of the Treasury, a role in the Government Whips Office.

Secretary of State for Scotland

He was appointed as Secretary of State for Scotland by Boris Johnson on 24 July 2019. Jack was the first MP of the 2017 intake to join the Cabinet.

Jack retained his seat at the 2019 general election with an increased share of the vote but with a reduced majority.

He was reappointed to the Truss ministry in September 2022.

On 10 September 2022, Jack attended the Accession Council and Principal Proclamation for His Majesty King Charles III at St James's Palace, London. Jack signed the Official Proclamation and witnessed His Majesty's Oath relating to the security of the Church of Scotland.

On 15 September 2022, as a member of the Royal Company of Archers, Jack and fellow Cabinet Minister Ben Wallace stood vigil at Queen Elizabeth II's coffin.

He was retained by Rishi Sunak when he became prime minister on 25 October 2022.

On 17 January 2023, Jack exercised the Section 35 power granted to him as Secretary of State for Scotland in the 1998 Scotland Act and stopped the Scottish Government's Gender Recognition Reform Bill from proceeding to Royal Assent.

Personal life
Jack is married to Ann (née Hodgson) and has three adult children. On 28 March 2020 he developed COVID-19 symptoms and became the third Cabinet minister to begin self-isolating.

Honours
 He was sworn in as a member of Her Majesty's Most Honourable Privy Council on 25 July 2019 at Buckingham Palace. This gave him the Honorific Prefix "The Right Honourable" for Life.
 He was appointed as a deputy lieutenant for the Lieutenancy of Dumfriesshire. This gave him the Post Nominal Letters "DL" for Life.

References

External links

1963 births
Living people
Scottish Conservative Party MPs
UK MPs 2017–2019
UK MPs 2019–present
Scottish farmers
People from Dumfries
People educated at Glenalmond College
Secretaries of State for Scotland
Members of the Privy Council of the United Kingdom
21st-century Scottish businesspeople
Deputy Lieutenants of Dumfries
Members of the Royal Company of Archers